= Oppression (board game) =

1986 board game

Oppression is a board game published in 1986 by Midson Holdings.

== Contents ==
Oppression is a game in which each player moves around the circular track on the board, and tries land on properties and assets to obtain them.

== Reception ==
Brian Walker reviewed Oppression for Games International magazine, and gave it 3 stars out of 5, and stated that "As the cover of the rule book states: 'WARNING! You may find this game to be offensive'. Well, do you?"
